Qin Dechun (December 11, 1893 – September 7, 1963) was a military officer and politician of the Republic of China. He was born in Shandong. He graduated from the Baoding Military Academy in Baoding, Hebei. He was a member of the Zhili clique before going over to the Nationalist Government. He fought in the Second Sino-Japanese War, and was the acting commander of the 29th Army during the Marco Polo Bridge Incident. After the defeat of the Kuomintang in the Chinese Civil War he went to Taiwan. He died in Taipei at the age of 71.

Awards and decorations
Order of Blue Sky and White Sun

Bibliography
 沈慶生「Qin Dechun」
 
 

1893 births
1963 deaths
Members of the Zhili clique
Mayors of Beijing
Baoding Military Academy alumni
People of the Northern Expedition
People of the Central Plains War
People of the Second Sino-Japanese War
Republic of China warlords from Shandong
Politicians from Linyi